This Girl may refer to:

 "This Girl" (Cookin' on 3 Burners song), 2016
 "This Girl" (Stafford Brothers and Eva Simons song), 2014
 "This Girl", a song by Kylie Minogue from the special edition bonus disc for Impossible Princess
 "This Girl", a song by Mary MacGregor from Torn Between Two Lovers
 "This Girl", a song by Dala from This Moment Is a Flash

See also
 That Girl (disambiguation)